Nebria fuscipes is a species of ground beetle in the Nebriinae subfamily that can be found in Hungary, Poland, Romania, Slovakia, and Ukraine.

References

fuscipes
Beetles described in 1850
Beetles of Europe